Christie Laing (born April 10, 1985) is a Canadian actress. She is best known for playing the role of Carly Diggle in Arrow and Marian in Once Upon a Time and Michelle Hunter in iZombie.

Early life
Laing was born in Vancouver and grew up in White Rock, British Columbia. She is of Belizean and British descent, Laing was a flight attendant and runner up to Miss Richmond. Laing and her two younger sisters, Nikki and Paige, grew up dancing until she focused on her acting career and changed her priorities.

Filmography

Films

Television

References

External links

1985 births
Living people
Actresses from Vancouver
Canadian film actresses
Canadian television actresses
Canadian people of Belizean descent
Canadian people of British descent
People from White Rock, British Columbia
Canadian beauty pageant contestants
Flight attendants